Aurora Sutra was a German dark wave band that was formed in Hamburg by Patricia Nigiani and Peter Spilles, both members of Project Pitchfork. They began recording under the name Aurora, but added the "Sutra" after the release of their debut The Land of Harm and Appletrees in 1993.

History 
Vocalist Patricia Nigiani and keyboardist Peter Spilles began recording under the name Aurora in 1993 as a side project to Project Pitchfork. Their debut The Land of Harm and Appletrees was released in 1993 and the band added "Sutra" to their name afterward. Their music was compared to Dead Can Dance and Modest Mussorgsky, especially his composition The Nursery. In 1994, the band followed with their second album The Dimension Gate by Talitha, marking their second and final release for the label. Conceptually the album's music is about being faced with the ultimate question of life after the evolution of man and rebirth of the universe. The album was also released with bonus tracks, four compositions celebrating the elementals air, earth, fire and water.

In 1995, Peter Spilles returned his focus to Project Pitchfork, with Patricia Nigiani assuming creative control of the Aurora's musical project. During this time, she recorded as part of the electronic band Sun God and released their 1995 self-titled debut album on Fifth Colvmn and Original Artists Group. In 1996, she released the band's third album Passing Over in Silence Towards Nuit, which was produced by Rodney Orpheus of The Cassandra Complex. Auro Sutra released their fourth studio album I and I Shall Descend in 1998 on Sound Factory.

Discography 
'Studio albums
As Aurora: The Land of Harm and Appletrees (1993, Talitha)The Dimension Gate (1994, Talitha)Passing Over in Silence Towards Nuit (1996, Sound Factory)I and I Shall Descend'' (1998, Sound Factory)

References

External links 
 
 
 Aurora Sutra at iTunes
 
 
 

Musical groups established in 1993
Musical groups disestablished in 1998
Neoclassical dark wave musical groups
1993 establishments in Germany